Heartbreaker is a 1983 American drama film directed by Frank Zuniga.This film has been music composed by Robert J. Walsh. The film starring Fernando Allende, Dawn Dunlap, Peter Gonzales Falcon and Miguel Ferrer in the lead roles.

Cast
 Fernando Allende
 Dawn Dunlap
 Peter Gonzales Falcon
 Miguel Ferrer
 Michael D. Roberts
 Robert Dryer
 Pepe Serna
 Rafael Campos

References

External links
 
 

1983 films
1983 drama films
American auto racing films
American drama films
Films shot in California
Films set in the United States
1980s English-language films
1980s American films